Bristol Township is a township in Bucks County, Pennsylvania, United States. The population was 54,582 at the 2010 census, making it the 13th largest municipality in the state. Bristol Township, along with Bristol Borough, is a cultural hub for Lower Bucks County, hosting celebrations of African and Latino heritage. Parts of the township consist of the neighborhoods of Fairless Hills and Levittown.

History
Before Bristol Township was settled, it was populated by Delaware Indians. It was formed as Buckingham Township in 1692 and was renamed Bristol Township in 1702. The springs at Bath, in Bristol Township, were popular among wealthy Philadelphians for a time, but lost popularity to those in Saratoga Springs, New York. The Delaware Canal was built in 1831 and connected Bristol to Easton, 60 miles to the north. Still, until the 1950s, Bristol Township was largely agricultural. In 1952, William Levitt began construction of his Levittown, which was located partly in Bristol Township.

The Phineas Pemberton House was listed on the National Register of Historic Places in 1971.

The War Dog Memorial, located in front of the Bristol Township Municipal Building, was dedicated in 2006.

Geography

Named places, past and present, in Bristol Township include Bath, Croydon, Edgely, Emilie, part of Levittown, Midway, Newportville, Pickpocket, and Pine Grove.

Natural features include Mill Creek, Neshaminy Creek, and Queen Anne Creek.

Demographics

As of the 2010 census, the township was 77.3% Non-Hispanic White, 10.2%  Black or African American, 0.2% Native American, 2.8% Asian, and 2.8% were two or more races. 7.4% of the population were of Hispanic or Latino ancestry.

As of the census of 2000, there were 55,521 people, 19,733 households, and 14,503 families residing in the township. The racial makeup of the township was 86.13% White, 8.45% African American, 0.21% Native American, 2.14% Asian, 0.04% Pacific Islander, 1.55% from other races, and 1.49% from two or more races. Hispanic or Latino of any race were 3.85% of the population.

There were 19,733 households, out of which 33.6% had children under the age of 18 living with them, 54.3% were married couples living together, 13.4% had a female householder with no husband present, and 26.5% were non-families. 21.2% of all households were made up of individuals, and 8.3% had someone living alone who was 65 years of age or older. The average household size was 2.79 and the average family size was 3.26.

In the township the population was spread out, with 25.8% under the age of 18, 8.8% from 18 to 24, 31.3% from 25 to 44, 21.4% from 45 to 64, and 12.7% who were 65 years of age or older. The median age was 36 years. For every 100 females, there were 97.6 males. For every 100 females age 18 and over, there were 94.9 males.

The median income for a household in the township was $48,090, and the median income for a family was $54,308. Males had a median income of $38,112 versus $28,797 for females. The per capita income for the township was $19,090. About 5.4% of families and 7.6% of the population were below the poverty line, including 10.8% of those under age 18 and 4.5% of those age 65 or over.

Education
Bristol Township students attend schools in the Bristol Township School District, and the notable public high school is Harry S. Truman High School.

Until 1990, for a period of over 12 years, the Lower Bucks Christian Academy leased the Benjamin Franklin Junior High School facility. That year, the school district denied renewal of the lease since it wished to repurpose the building as an elementary school.

Climate

According to the Köppen climate classification system, Bristol Twp has a Humid subtropical climate (Cfa). Cfa climates are characterized by all months having an average mean temperature > , at least four months with an average mean temperature ≥ , at least one month with an average mean temperature ≥  and no significant precipitation difference between seasons. Although most summer days are slightly humid in Bristol Twp, episodes of heat and high humidity can occur with heat index values > . The average wettest month is July which corresponds with the annual peak in thunderstorm activity. Episodes of extreme cold and wind can occur with wind chill values < . Ice storms and large snowstorms depositing ≥  occur once every few years, particularly during nor’easters from December through February.

Ecology

According to the A. W. Kuchler U.S. potential natural vegetation types, Bristol Twp would have a dominant vegetation type of Appalachian Oak (104) with a dominant vegetation form of Eastern Hardwood Forest (25). The spring bloom typically begins by April 7 and fall color usually peaks by November 4.

Transportation

Bristol Township is the location of a major highway junction between Interstate 95, the Pennsylvania Turnpike (Interstate 276), and Interstate 295. This interchange is still partially under construction, with the project to build it ongoing. Interstate 95 follows the Pennsylvania Turnpike between the interchange and the Delaware River–Turnpike Toll Bridge over the Delaware River. Other highways serving Bristol Township include U.S. Route 13, which runs southwest–northeast through the township along Bristol Pike, and Pennsylvania Route 413, which runs north–south through the township along Veterans Highway and leads to the Burlington–Bristol Bridge over the Delaware River. SEPTA Regional Rail's Trenton Line serves the Croydon section of the township at Croydon station, with other nearby stations including Bristol station in the borough of Bristol and Levittown station in the borough of Tullytown.

References

External links

Bristol Township

Townships in Bucks County, Pennsylvania
Townships in Pennsylvania
Pennsylvania populated places on the Delaware River